Francisco Hervé Allamand (born 1942) is a Chilean geologist known for his contributions to the paleogeography and tectonics of Chile and Antarctica.

Together with I. Fuenzalida, E. Araya and A. Solano he named the Liquiñe-Ofqui Fault in 1979.

In a 2012 contribution to the blog of El Mercurio he expressed concern for the sudden emergence of new geology degrees offered by both traditional and non-traditional private Chilean universities stating that granting new degrees involves complex and costly tasks.

Hervé Island in Antarctica is named after Francisco Hervé.

References

External links
Francisco Hervé: Si la tierra hablara..., televised interview and conversation with Cristián Warnken.

1942 births
20th-century Chilean geologists
Tectonicists
Living people
University of Chile alumni
Hokkaido University alumni
Academic staff of the University of Chile
Academic staff of the Andrés Bello National University
Members of the Chilean Academy of Sciences
21st-century Chilean geologists